Too Many Shadows is an EP by indie rock band Pinback.  It features live-in-studio performances as well as a few songs left off of the 'Summer in Abaddon' album.

Track listing
 "Photograph Taken" - 3:41
 "My Star" - 3:49
 "Forced Motion" - 4:56
 "Microtonic Wave" (live band version) - 4:04
 "Non Photo Blue" (live band version) - 3:37
 "Fortress" (live band version) - 3:55
 "Boo" (live band version) - 5:08

Pinback albums
2004 EPs